Timothy Maxwell Delve Cocks  (born 29 September 1952) is a former South African rugby union player.

Playing career

Cocks represented the  Schools team at the 1970 annual Craven Week tournament. After school, Cocks played for the Natal under–20 team and thereafter for the Natal Currie Cup side. In 1979, Cocks was in the South African Barbarians side that toured to the United Kingdom under manager Chick Henderson, alongside players such as Divan Serfontein and Errol Tobias.

Cocks toured with the Springboks to South American during October 1980. He did not play in any test matches on tour, but played in three tour matches, scoring two tries for the Springboks. On thirteen occasions he was selected on the replacement bench for the Springboks, but never made on to the field in a test match.

See also
List of South Africa national rugby union players – Springbok no. 513

References

1952 births
Living people
Rugby union players from Durban
Sharks (Currie Cup) players
South Africa international rugby union players
South African rugby union players
Rugby union fullbacks